Mejo Joseph is a music director from Malayalam Cinema. He made his debut in the blockbuster Malayalam movie Notebook. He has given a splendid performance in Vaarikkuzhiyile Kolapathakam which starred Amith Chakalakkal

Personal life

Mejo was born to Joseph and Rosemary on 28 January 1981 in Thrissur. Mejo married Merrin on 26 June 2011. The couple has 4 children 2 sons and 2 daughters. He did his schooling at Don Bosco High School, Irinjalakuda. Noted director Rosshan Andrrews is his brother-in-law.

Career

Mejo made his debut in 2006 Malayalam movie Notebook which was directed by his brother-in-law Roshan Andrews. The music won him immediate attention. He also made a cameo appearance in the film as 'Firoz' a music enthusiast. Later he worked with Johny Antony for the movie Cycle. The music of Cycle also became superhit and Mejo got high acclaims.

Filmography

As music director

As actor

References

External links
 
 Orkut Profile : http://www.orkut.com/Profile.aspx?uid=10973511932055998719

Living people
Musicians from Thrissur
Malayalam film score composers
1981 births
Don Bosco schools alumni
Film musicians from Kerala
Indian male film score composers
Male actors from Thrissur